Pàdua is a station of the Barcelona Metro on the FGC-operated line L7 (also known as Línia de Balmes). The station is situated under Carrer de Balmes.

The station opened in 1953 with the opening of the line from Gràcia railway station to Avinguda Tibidabo.

See also
List of Barcelona Metro stations
List of railway stations in Barcelona

References

External links
 
 Information and photos about the station at Trenscat.com
 Information and photos about the station at TransporteBCN.es

Barcelona Metro line 7 stations
Railway stations in Spain opened in 1953
Transport in Sarrià-Sant Gervasi